(commonly known as Konami) is a Japanese multinational video game and entertainment company headquartered in Chūō, Tokyo. The company also produces and distributes trading cards, anime, tokusatsu, pachinko machines, slot machines, and arcade cabinets. Konami has casinos around the world and operates health and physical fitness clubs across Japan.

Konami's video game franchises include Metal Gear, Silent Hill, Castlevania, Contra, Rocket Knight Adventures, Frogger, Tokimeki Memorial, Parodius, Gradius, Yu-Gi-Oh!, Suikoden, and eFootball. Additionally, Konami owns Bemani, known for Dance Dance Revolution and Beatmania, as well as the assets of former game developer Hudson Soft, known for Bomberman, Adventure Island, Bonk, and Star Soldier. Konami is the nineteenth-largest game company in the world by revenue. Konami also publishes the Yu-Gi-Oh Trading Card Game.

The company originated in 1969 as a jukebox rental and repair business in Toyonaka, Osaka, Japan, by Kagemasa Kōzuki, who remains the company's chairman. The name Konami is a portmanteau of the names of three founding members: Kagemasa Kozuki, Yoshinobu Nakama, and Tatsuo Miyasako.

Konami is headquartered in Tokyo. In the United States, Konami manages its video game business from Aviation Blvd, California and its casino gaming business from Paradise, Nevada. Its Australian gaming operations are in Sydney. As of March 2019, it owns 22 consolidated subsidiaries around the world.

History

The company was founded on 21 March 1969 and was officially incorporated under the name  on 19 March 1973. The company's founder and chairman, Kagemasa Kōzuki (also known as Kaz Kozuki), ran a jukebox rental and repair business in Toyonaka, Osaka before transforming the business into a manufacturer of amusement machines for video arcades. Their first coin-operated video game was released in 1978, and they began exporting products to the United States the following year.

Konami began to achieve success with arcade games in the early 1980s, starting with Scramble (1981), followed by hits such as Frogger (1981), Super Cobra (1981), Time Pilot (1982), Roc'n Rope (1983), Track & Field (1983), and Yie Ar Kung-Fu (1985). Many of their early games were licensed to other companies for US release, including Stern Electronics, Sega, and Gremlin Industries. They established their U.S. subsidiary, Konami of America, Inc. in 1982. It was during this period that Konami began expanding their video game business into the home consumer market following a brief stint releasing video games for the Atari 2600 in 1982 for the U.S. market. The company released numerous games for the MSX home computer standard in 1983, followed by the Nintendo Entertainment System in 1985. Numerous Konami franchises were established during this period on both platforms, as well as the arcades, such as Gradius, Castlevania, Twin Bee, Ganbare Goemon, Contra, and Metal Gear, in addition to success with hit licensed games such as Teenage Mutant Ninja Turtles (TMNT). Due to the success of their arcade and NES games, Konami's earnings grew from $10 million in 1987 to $300 million in 1991. The first TMNT arcade game (1989) was Konami's highest-grossing arcade game.

The company started supporting the 16-bit video game consoles during this period, starting with the Super NES in 1990, followed by the PC Engine in 1991, and the Sega Genesis in 1992.

After the launch of the Sega Saturn and PlayStation in 1994, Konami became a business divisional organization with the formation of various Konami Computer Entertainment (KCE) subsidiaries, starting with KCE Tokyo and KCE Osaka (later known as KCE Studios) in April 1995, followed by KCE Japan (later known as Kojima Productions) in April 1996. Each KCE subsidiary created different intellectual properties such as KCE Tokyo's Silent Hill series and KCE Japan's Metal Gear Solid series (a revival of the Metal Gear series on MSX). In 1997, Konami started producing rhythm games for arcades under the Bemani brand and branched off into the collectible card game business with the launch of the Yu-Gi-Oh! Trading Card Game.

In July 2000, the company's legal English name was changed to Konami Corporation, but the Japanese legal name remained the same. As the company transitioned into developing video games for the sixth-generation consoles, they branched out into the health and fitness business acquiring People Co., Ltd and Daiei Olympic Sports Club, Inc. which became Konami subsidiaries. In August 2001, the company invested in another video game publisher, Hudson Soft, which became a consolidated subsidiary after Konami accepted new third-party shares issued by them. In March 2006, Konami merged all their video game development divisions into a new subsidiary known as Konami Digital Entertainment Co. (KDE), as the parent company became a pure holding company. Their headquarters were relocated to Minato, Tokyo, in 2007.

The absorption of Hudson Soft in 2012 resulted in the addition of several other franchises including: Adventure Island, Bonk, Bloody Roar, Bomberman, Far East of Eden, and Star Soldier.

In April 2015, Konami delisted itself from the New York Stock Exchange following the dissolution of their Kojima Productions subsidiary.  In a translated interview with Nikkei Trendy Net published in the following month, the newly appointed president of Konami's gaming division, Konami Digital Entertainment, Hideki Hayakawa, announced that Konami would shift their focus towards mobile gaming for a while, claiming that "mobile is where the future of gaming lies." The trade name of the company was changed from Konami Corporation to Konami Holdings Corporation during the same month.

In 2017, Konami announced that they would be reviving some of the company's other well-known video game titles following the success of their Nintendo Switch launch title Super Bomberman R.

In early 2020, Konami moved their headquarters to the Ginza district of Tokyo, which includes a facility for holding esports events as well as a school for esports players.

Konami announced a major restructuring of Konami Digital Entertainment on 25 January 2021, which including the dissolution of its Product Divisions 1, 2, and 3 to be reconsolidated into a new structure to be announced at a later time. Konami affirmed this would not affect their commitment to video games and was only an internal restructuring. On July 1, 2022 Konami changed their corporate name again from Konami Holdings Corporation to Konami Group Corporation.

Corporate structure

Japan

 Konami Group Corporation
 Konami Digital Entertainment Co., Ltd.
 Konami Sports & Life Co., Ltd.
 Konami Amusement Co., Ltd.
 Konami Real Estate, Inc.
 KPE, Inc.
 Konami Manufacturing and Service, Inc.
 Konami Facility Service, Inc.
 KME Co., Ltd.
 Takasago Electric Industry Co., Ltd.
 Digital Golf, Inc.: On 20 January 2011, Konami Corporation announced the acquisition of Digital Golf via share exchange. Digital Golf became a wholly owned subsidiary of Konami. The exchange became effective on 1 March 2011.
 Internet Revolution, Inc.
 Biz Share Corporation
 Combi Wellness Corporation
 The Club At Yebisu Garden Co., Ltd.

Australia
 Konami Australia Pty Ltd (established in 1996)

America

 Konami Corporation of America: Current U.S.-based holding company.
 Konami Digital Entertainment, Inc.: former American holding company, formerly Konami of America Inc., Konami Corporation of America. On 13 October 2003, Konami Corporation of Redwood City, California announced it was expanding its operations to El Segundo, California, under the new name of Konami Digital Entertainment, Inc. The Redwood City operations have since been consolidated to El Segundo in 2007.
 Konami Gaming, Inc. in Paradise, Nevada.
Konami Cross Media NY

Europe
 Konami Digital Entertainment B.V.: European-based holding company.
 Konami Digital Entertainment GmbH: former holding company Europe, formerly Konami Limited, Konami Corporation of Europe B.V. On 31 March 2003, Konami of Europe announced it would be renamed as Konami Digital Entertainment GmbH at the start of Konami's new financial year, on 1 April 2003.

Asia
 Konami Digital Entertainment Limited (科樂美數碼娛樂有限公司): Established in September 1994 as Konami (Hong Kong) Limited. Korea and Singapore divisions were established in October 2000. In June 2001, the company changed name to Konami Marketing (Asia) Ltd. (科樂美行銷(亞洲)有限公司). In March 2006, the company was renamed Konami Digital Entertainment Limited.
 Konami Software Shanghai, Inc. (科乐美软件（上海）有限公司): Established in June 2000.
 Konami Digital Entertainment Co. (주식회사 코나미 디지털 엔터테인먼트): South Korea-based game producer and distributor, originally established as the Korea branch of Konami Digital Entertainment Limited. On 1 May 2008, it became a separate company, and inherited the existing operations of the former Korea branch in June 2008.

On 7 November 2005, Konami Corporation announced restructuring Konami Corporation into a holding company, by moving its Japanese Digital Entertainment Business segment under Konami Corporation. The Digital Entertainment Business became Konami Digital Entertainment Co., Ltd. The newly established Konami Corporation was expected to begin operation on 31 March 2006.

Konami Digital Entertainment

 is Konami's Japanese video game development and publishing division founded on 31 March 2006. Before Konami Corporation had formally changed to a holding company in 2006, various forms of Konami Digital Entertainment companies had been established either as holding company or publisher. The last of the company, the Japan-based Konami Digital Entertainment Co., Ltd., was split from Konami Corporation during the holding company restructuring process.

Subsidiaries
Konami Digital Entertainment Co., Ltd.: Japanese division, established on 31 March 2003.
Konami Digital Entertainment, Inc.: North American division, established on 13 October 2003.
Konami Digital Entertainment GmbH: European division, established on 1 April 2003.
Konami Digital Entertainment Limited: Hong Kong division. Established in September 1994 as Konami (Hong Kong) Limited. In March 2006, it was renamed to Konami Digital Entertainment Limited.
KME Co., Ltd (KME Corporation): music division established on 1 October 2010.

Former subsidiaries
Konami Computer Entertainment Nagoya, Inc. (KCEN), founded on 1 October 1996, was dissolved along with Konami Computer Entertainment Kobe, Inc. (KCEK) in December 2002.

On 16 December 2004, Konami Corporation announced Konami Online, Inc., Konami Computer Entertainment Studios, Inc., Konami Computer Entertainment Tokyo, Inc., Konami Computer Entertainment Japan, Inc. would merge into Konami Corporation, effective on March 1, 2005.

On 22 February 2005, Konami Corporation announced Konami Media Entertainment, Inc. would merge into Konami Corporation, effective on 1 March 2005.
On 11 March 2005, Konami Corporation announced Konami Traumer, Inc would be merged back into Konami Corporation, effective on June 1, 2005.

On 5 January 2006, Konami Corporation announced the merger of Konami Sports Corporation merged with its parent company, Konami Sports Life Corporation. The parent would be dissolved under the merger, and Konami Sports would become the wholly owned subsidiary of Konami Corporation after share exchange between KC and KS. After the share exchange, KS would be renamed Konami Sports & Life Co., Ltd. On 28 February 2006, Konami Sports Corporation merged with its parent company, Konami Sports Life Corporation, and became Konami Sports Corporation.

On 21 September 2010, Konami Corporation announced it has signed an agreement to acquire with Abilit Corporation via share exchange. After the transaction, Abilit Corporation became a wholly owned subsidiary of Konami Corporation, effective 1 January 2011. On 1 January 2011, Abilit Corporation was renamed to Takasago Electric Industry Co.,Ltd. As part of the acquisition, Biz Share Corporation also became a subsidiary of Konami Corporation.

Megacyber Corporation
On 2 October 2006, Konami Corporation announced it had completed the acquisition of mobile phone content developer Megacyber Corporation.

On 6 February 2007, Konami Corporation announced Megacyber Corporation to be merged into Konami Digital Entertainment Co., Ltd., with Konami Digital Entertainment Co., Ltd. being the surviving company, effective on 1 April 2007.

Video games

Major titles by Konami include the action Castlevania series, the survival horror Silent Hill series, the action shooter Contra series, the platform adventure Ganbare Goemon series, the platform adventure Rocket Knight Adventures series, the stealth action Metal Gear series, the role-playing Suikoden series, the Bemani rhythm game series (which includes Dance Dance Revolution, Beatmania IIDX, GuitarFreaks, DrumMania, and Pop'n Music, among others), Dancing with the Stars, the dating simulation Tokimeki Memorial series, and football simulation Pro Evolution Soccer.

Konami produced its shoot 'em up arcade games such as Gradius, Life Force, Time Pilot, Gyruss, Parodius, Axelay, and TwinBee. Konami's games based on cartoon licenses, especially the Batman: The Animated Series, Teenage Mutant Ninja Turtles, Tiny Toon Adventures, and Animaniacs series, but other American productions like The Simpsons, Bucky O'Hare, G.I. Joe, X-Men, and The Goonies, and French comic Asterix all have seen release at some point in the past by Konami either on arcades and/or video game consoles.

Some cinematically styled franchises from Konami are Silent Hill survival horror franchise, and the Metal Gear series. Another successful franchise is Winning Eleven, the spiritual sequel to International Superstar Soccer. In Japan, it is known for the popular Jikkyō Powerful Pro Yakyū series baseball series and the Zone of the Enders games. The company has picked up Saw from Brash Entertainment when the game's production had been suspended due to financial issues.

Konami is known for its password, the Konami Code, which traditionally gives many power-ups in its games.

Film production
In 2006, Konami started producing films based on their franchises. Konami produced the Silent Hill film (released in 2006) and announced that they will produce a Metal Gear Solid film.

Personal computing 
In 2020, Konami launched a PC gaming brand in Japan known as Arespear, which includes desktop computers, keyboards, and headsets (the last of which designed in collaboration with Konami's Bemani musicians).

Controversies

Silent Hills and reduced video game development

Silent Hills, set to be the ninth installment of the Silent Hill franchise, was abruptly cancelled in April 2015 without explanation despite the critical acclaim and success of P.T., a playable teaser. Hours after the announcement, Konami delisted itself from the New York Stock Exchange.

Game co-director and writer Guillermo del Toro publicly criticized the cancellation as not making any sense and questioned what he described as a "scorched earth" approach to removing the trailer. Due to the experience, del Toro stated that he would never work on another video game.

Konami Digital Entertainment CEO, Hideki Hayakawa, announced that, with few exceptions, Konami would stop making console games and instead focus on the mobile gaming platform; a decision that was heavily criticized by the video gaming community. However, Konami UK's community manager, Graham Day, has denied the claims that it was exiting the console industry.

Kojima Productions

On 3 March 2015, Konami announced they would be shifting focus away from individual studios, notably Kojima Productions. Internal sources claimed the restructure was due to a clash between Hideo Kojima and Konami. References to Kojima were soon stripped from marketing material, and Kojima's position as an executive vice president of Konami Digital Entertainment was removed from the company's official listing of executives.

Later that year, Konami's legal department barred Kojima from accepting the award for Best Action-Adventure for his work on Metal Gear Solid V: The Phantom Pain at The Game Awards 2015. When announced during the event, the audience booed in disapproval of Konami's actions. Host Geoff Keighley expressed his disappointment in Konami's actions. After actor Kiefer Sutherland accepted the award in Kojima's stead, a choir sang "Quiet's Theme" from The Phantom Pain as a tribute to the absent Kojima. Kojima left Konami several days afterwards, re-opening Kojima Productions as an independent company.

Treatment of employees and ex-employees
In August 2015, The Nikkei criticized Konami for its unethical treatment of employees. In June 2017, The Nikkei further reported on Konami's continued clashes with Kojima Productions, preventing the studio's application for health insurance, as well as Konami's actions in making it difficult for former employees to get future jobs; they are notably forbidden from mentioning their work with Konami on their résumés. Konami also started filing complaints against other game companies that hired ex-Konami employees, leading to an unspecified major game company warning its staff against doing so. A former employee of Konami stated: "If an ex-[Konami employee] is interviewed by the media, the company will send that person a letter through a legal representative, in some cases indicating that Konami is willing to take them to court"; they also pressured an ex-employee into closing their new business.

See also
 Good-Feel, an independent video game company founded by former Konami employees
 Treasure, another independent video game company founded by former Konami employees
 Ultra Games, an American shell corporation and publishing label formed by Konami
 Kojima Productions, an independent studio from Hideo Kojima with the same name of the previous Konami subsidiary

Notes

References

Sources
 Konami Annual Report: 2002, 2003,2004, 2005, 2006, 2007, 2008. Contains summarized history of the company
 Konami Group History

External links

 
Amusement companies of Japan
Companies listed on the Tokyo Stock Exchange
Companies listed on the London Stock Exchange
Companies formerly listed on the New York Stock Exchange
Companies formerly listed on the Singapore Exchange
Conglomerate companies based in Tokyo
Conglomerate companies established in 1969
Health care companies of Japan
Holding companies based in Tokyo
Japanese brands
Japanese companies established in 1969
Manufacturing companies based in Tokyo
Portmanteaus
Slot machine manufacturers
Software companies based in Tokyo
Trading card companies
Video game companies established in 1969
Video game companies of Japan
Video game development companies
Video game publishers
1980s initial public offerings